Sun over Denmark (Danish: Sol over Danmark) is a 1936 Danish comedy film directed by Holger-Madsen and starring Henrik Malberg, Albrecht Schmidt and Sigrid Horne-Rasmussen. While crossing Denmark on holiday, two boys and two girls keep encountering each other. It was remade as the Swedish film Sun Over Sweden in 1938.

Cast
 Henrik Malberg as 	Pastor Nicolaj Jacobsen
 Maria Grünwald-Bertelsen as 	Margrethe Jacobsen
 Albrecht Schmidt as 	Fiskeeksportør Hans Jacobsen
 Sigrid Horne-Rasmussen as 	Anna Jensen
 Astrid Neumann as 	Fru Winge
 Knud Rex as 	Poul Jacobsen
 Bent Bentzen as 	Jørgen Juhl
 Agnete Arne-Jensen as 	Fru Petersen
 Grethe Sjölin as 	Ebba Petersen
 Gerda Neumann as 	Kirsten Winge
 Bruno Tyron as 	Chauffør Lars Christian Jensen
 Else Würtz as 	Tjenestepigen Marie
 Aage Redal as 	Politibetjent
 Henry Skjær as 	Operasanger

References

Bibliography 
 Conrich, Ian. Film's Musical Moments. Edinburgh University Press, 2006.

External links 
 

1936 films
Danish comedy films
1936 comedy films
1930s Danish-language films
Films directed by  Holger-Madsen